Mirza Adeeb,  (—; 4 April 1914 – 31 July 1999), also known as Meerza Adeeb, (—), was a Pakistani Urdu writer of dramas and short stories. His plays and short stories won him six prizes and awards from the Pakistan Writers' Guild.

Name
Mirza Adeeb's birth name was Mirza Dilawer Ali, but he came to be known in the literary world as Mirza Adeeb. (Mirza denotes the rank of a high nobleman or Prince, and Adeeb means 'Litterateur'.)

Early life
He was born in 1914, in Lahore, British India to Mirza Basheer Ali. He attended Government Islamia High School, Bhati Gate, Lahore. He got his Bachelor of Arts degree from Islamia College, Lahore. He initially focused on poetry, then devoted himself to playwriting.

Career

Plays
At first, being influenced from the —, he wrote romantic prose.

Later, he switched to writing plays about everyday events and incidents taking place in the society; focusing more on social problems and quotidian issues. His later works were pragmatist and verisimilitudinous. He used simple and everyday language in his plays, which enabled them to get a greater audience. Moreover, he had begun writing one-act dramas, which made them easier to broadcast over radio and television. When he affiliated himself with Radio Pakistan, many of his plays were broadcast and they gained popularity among the masses. He is listed as a prominent Urdu playwright of the Modern Era.

Other works
His main works, other than dramas, include stories and biographies. He also wrote critical essays and commentaries on books, besides writing columns in newspapers. He was also influenced by the —. He was also the editor of magazines, of which the most notable is —. He also translated some American stories to Urdu.

Style
Following are the main features of Mirza Adeeb's style of writing:

Objectivity: His plays had a strong sense of objectivity in them.
Riveting dialogues: The dialogues he chose were grounded, yet captivating. Each character spoke according to his/her social status and his dramas did not contain artificial, literary dialogues. His dialogues also contained witty repartees and striking replies.
Versatility: His story lines include a variety of topics, taken from the prosaic lives on common people.
Pragmatism: Rather than focusing on characterisation, as did many of his contemporaries, he focused more on events. 
Humanitarianism: His plays and stories have a humanitarian and philanthropic outlook.

Works
His selective drama-collections are:
, 
, 
, 
, 
, 
m',  (1967)
,  and
, 
His selective short-story collections are:
, 
, 
, 
, 
Sharfoo Ki Kahani, 
Wo Larki Kon Thi, 
His collection of personal biographies is:
, 
,  is his autobiography.

Awards
Presidential Award for playwriting, 1969
Pride of Performance Award for literature in 1981

See also

Notes

References

1914 births
1999 deaths
Writers from Lahore
Punjabi people
Pakistani dramatists and playwrights
Pakistani male short story writers
Urdu-language short story writers
Muslim writers
Government Islamia College alumni
Recipients of the Pride of Performance
20th-century dramatists and playwrights
20th-century Pakistani short story writers
20th-century Pakistani male writers
Pakistani progressives
Recipients of the Adamjee Literary Award